The Dan River, formerly known as the Dan Shui (丹水) or 800 Li Black River (八百里黑江), is a river located in Shaanxi province in the People's Republic of China. The longest tributary of the Han River, the Dan rises at Heilongkou (黑龙口) in the Qin Mountains of Shaanxi province then flows south east through Shangluo City, Danfeng County, Shangnan County and Xichuan County, Henan province before joining the Han River at Danjiangkou, Hubei province.

Origin of the name
There are three different theories as to how the Dan River got its name:
When the Black River (黑水) flooded in ancient times, Yu the Great assigned Dan Zhu the task of bringing it under control. Dan Zhu died during the work so the local people renamed the Black River in his honor.
Following the Battle of Changping between the States of Qi and Zhao during the Warring States period (771–426 BCE), 400,000 bodies were dumped in the river causing its waters to turn red. Since in Chinese "丹" can mean "red", the river was renamed accordingly.
Traditionally, the same is said to come from the "Dan fish" (丹鱼), a token of longevity.

Geography
The Dan River Basin is located between 109°30'-112°00' East and 32°30'-34°10' North.

History
According to the Yu Gong, the geography section of the Book of Documents, the Dan River joined the Han River at a place called Laohe Kou (老河口 literally: old river mouth).

Later on during and after the Tang dynasty (618–907 CE) under the Fan Zhen (藩镇) or "Buffer Town" system of administration, the Dan River area had the power to block transport on the Huai and Bian Rivers. As a result, the Dan became an important waterway in the Yangtze and Huai River region.

At the time of the Ming dynasty (1368–1644) and later, the Dan was used by merchants of the Guanlong Trading Bloc (关陇集团) to transport goods to Xiangyang and Hankou, both in Hubei Province. At the same time many shipping (船帮会馆) and horse-drawn transportation (马帮会馆) guilds were established at Longju Village (龙驹寨) (modern day Danfeng County, Shaanxi Province), illustrating the flourishing trade on the Dan River.

In 1693, during the reign of the Qing Kangxi Emperor, both Xi'an and Fengxiang County on the Guanzhong Plain suffered crop failure bringing famine to the region. Ding Sikong (丁思孔), governor general of the provinces of Hubei and Guangdong with the assistance of others, sent relief aid from Xiangyang via the Dan River into Shaanxi Province after carrying out dredging operations. A decade later on 16 February 1731, the Yongzheng Emperor ordered grain to be dispatched from Hubei and Guangdong to Shangzhou, Shaanxi as a contingency against food shortages. In 1737, during the Qianlong Emperor's reign, crops failed in Shangzhou and grain prices rocketed. The Qing Guangxu Emperor's reign saw the 1890 occupation of Beijing by the Eight-Nation Alliance following the Boxer Rebellion. The emperor along with Empress Dowager Cixi escaped to Xi'an. Grain taxes from the Jingdai (荆襄) District (south of modern-day Neixiang County, Henan) were forwarded along the Dan River to Longju Village then on to Xi'an for use by the emperor along with his government and army.

With the advent of the Republic of China in 1912, a ballad spread amongst the people of Xichuan County featuring the words "The boatmen have three knives stuck in their stomachs: the river pirates, the bandits and the submerged reefs. They have only three choices: starvation, death by drowning or imprisonment." In turn, the boatmen themselves referred to the Dan as the "Black River", emphasizing the bandit problem.
At that time, three relatively large families controlled shipping; those of Ling Laosi (凌老四) from Jingziguan Town (荆紫关镇)，Guo Laopo (郭老婆) from Laocheng Town (老城镇) and Liguanqiao Town's (李官桥镇) Jin Yulou (金玉楼), head of the Red Guild (红帮会). They were all considered leeches and exploiters by the boatmen. Records show that cargoes carried on the Dan River included kerosene, tobacco, chinaware, silk, medicinal ingredients, walnuts, peach kernels (used in Chinese medicine) and specialty products from the mountains.

During the 1940s onwards, waterborne trade on the Dan went into decline.

Reasons for the decline in trade
Three primary factors account for the decline in trade on the Dan River during the previous century. Firstly, wooden sailboats were a relatively backward technology. On the Shangluo section of the waterway a maximum of only four tons could be carried upriver and 10 tons downstream. With calm water, the  round trip from Longju Village to Jingziguan took 20 days and involved heavy physical work with little return. However, in transportation terms, wooden sailboats were quite advanced for the time and there was no better option available. With the rapid growth of rail and road transportation from the early days of the Republic of China the sailboat's days were numbered.The second factor concerns economic changes that occurred from the 1950s onwards. China's implementation of economic regionalization and a state monopoly on purchasing and marketing effectively severed the upstream/downstream trade links on the Dan River. A decade later the 1962 "Cut off the tail of capitalism" policy (割掉资本主义尾巴) halted part-time shipping activities by the farming community.

Thirdly, with deforestation and the construction of reservoirs the water sources for the Dan River declined. Large quantities of silt in the river bed increased the number of dangerous reefs so that parts of the waterway became impassable.

Major floods and natural disasters
The following are recorded amongst the many natural disasters that have occurred through history in the Dan River region:

References

This article is based on a translation of 丹江 in Chinese Wikipedia. 

Rivers of Hubei
Rivers of Shaanxi